Sinéad Goldrick (born 2 May 1990) is a dual code footballer, playing at the highest level in both Gaelic football and Australian rules football. She captained Dublin ladies in the 2014 All-Ireland Senior Ladies' Football Championship Final and was a member of the Dublin teams that won the All-Ireland Senior Ladies' Football Championship in 2017, 2018 and 2019. She was also a member of the Dublin team that won the 2018 Ladies' National Football League. In 2019 she won her seventh All Star award. During the 2010s she was also a prominent member of the Foxrock–Cabinteely team that won Dublin and Leinster titles and played in All-Ireland finals. In October 2019 it was announced that Goldrick has agreed to play for Melbourne Football Club of the AFLW in 2020 and she won a premiership with the club in 2022 (AFLW Season 7).

Early years, family and education
Goldrick attended St. Brigid's Girls National School, Cabinteely. Between 2002 and 2008 she completed her secondary level education at Coláiste Íosagáin. In addition to Gaelic football, in her youth she was involved in various sports and activities including gymnastics, Irish dancing and athletics. She also represented Coláiste Íosagáin at basketball, winning multiple All-Ireland titles. She recalls her father taking her to Croke Park for the first time, when she was about 10, to watch a Dublin team, featuring Jason Sherlock, play against Meath in the Leinster Senior Football Championship. Between 2008 and 2011 she attended University College Dublin where she gained a BSc in Social Sciences. Between 2011 and 2012 she attended the Dublin Institute of Technology where she gained a MSc in Marketing.

Gaelic football

Clubs
Foxrock–Cabinteely
Goldrick began playing for Foxrock–Cabinteely while attending St. Brigid's Girls National School. During the 2010s she was a prominent member of Foxrock Cabinteely teams that won Dublin and Leinster titles and played in All-Ireland finals.

Intervarsity
While attending University College Dublin and the Dublin Institute of Technology, Goldrick also played for UCD GAA and DIT GAA.

Inter-county
Together with Niamh McEvoy, Noëlle Healy and Hannah Tyrrell, Goldrick was part of a generation of Dublin ladies' footballers who won All-Ireland titles at under-14, under-16 and under-18 levels before playing for the senior team. Since 2008 she has been a regular member of the Dublin senior panel. However she missed out on the 2010 All-Ireland Senior Ladies' Football Championship Final after choosing to go travelling in Thailand. She captained Dublin   in the 2014 All-Ireland Senior Ladies' Football Championship Final. She was also a member of the Dublin teams that won the 2017, 2018 and 2019 All-Ireland finals. She scored the opening goal for Dublin in the 2019 final. She was a member of the Dublin team that won the 2018 Ladies' National Football League. In 2019 she won her seventh All Star award.

Australian rules football

In October 2019 it was announced that Goldrick and her Dublin teammate, Niamh McEvoy, have agreed to play for Melbourne Football Club of the AFLW in 2020. She played all 6 games in her debut year before the 2020 season was cut short, and returned to play in 2021.

Personal life
Between 2013 and 2018 Goldrick worked for Vodafone Ireland in various roles including as a Vodafone Foundation executive and mobile app developer. She has also worked as a brand ambassador for both Lidl and AIG. Goldrick is dating the Dublin and Cuala hurler, David Treacy.

Honours

Gaelic football
Dublin
All-Ireland Senior Ladies' Football Championship
Winners: 2017, 2018, 2019: 3
Runner up: 2014, 2015, 2016: 3
Ladies' National Football League 
 2018
All-Ireland Under-18 Ladies' Football Championship
Winners: 2008
All-Ireland Under-16 Ladies' Football Championship
Winners: 2006
All-Ireland Under-14 Ladies' Football Championship
Winners: 2004
Foxrock–Cabinteely
All-Ireland Ladies' Club Football Championship
Runner up: 2016, 2018: 2
Leinster Ladies' Senior Club Football Championship
Winners: 2015, 2016, 2017, 2018: 4
Runner up: 2012: 1
Dublin Ladies' Senior Football Championship
Winners: 2012, 2015, 2016, 2017, 2018: 5
Individual
All Stars
Winner: 2012, 2013, 2014, 2015, 2016, 2018, 2019: 7

Australian Rules
AFLW premiership player: Season 7 (2022)

References

External links 

Living people
Dublin inter-county ladies' footballers
UCD Gaelic footballers
Alumni of University College Dublin
Alumni of Dublin Institute of Technology
Irish women's basketball players
Irish female players of Australian rules football
Melbourne Football Club (AFLW) players
Ladies' Gaelic footballers who switched code
Vodafone people
American International Group people
Sportspeople from Dún Laoghaire–Rathdown
Irish expatriate sportspeople in Australia
1990 births